The Andorra national football team represents Andorra in association football and is controlled by the Andorran Football Federation, the governing body for football in Andorra. The team has enjoyed very little success due to the Principality's tiny population, the fifth smallest of any UEFA country (only Liechtenstein, San Marino, Gibraltar and the Faroe Islands are smaller).

Andorra's first official game was a 6–1 defeat in a friendly match to Estonia in 1996. Since the qualifying rounds for the UEFA Euro 2000 tournament, Andorra have competed in qualifying for every European Championship and World Cup but have had very little success. They have only won thirteen matches since becoming recognised by FIFA in 1996.

History
Though the Andorran Football Federation formed in 1994, and the domestic league started in 1995, the national team could not participate in major championships until it gained affiliation with governing bodies FIFA and UEFA in 1996. The national team played its first match against Estonia in Andorra La Vella and lost 6–1.

Andorra's first match in a FIFA-sanctioned competition was a 3–1 loss to Armenia on 5 September 1998 in a qualifier for UEFA Euro 2000. Andorra lost all ten qualifiers for the tournament. The team particularly struggled in away matches; each loss was by at least three goals. Andorra scored only three goals, two of which were penalties, and two of which were in the away matches. Andorra conceded 28 goals, and their biggest defeat of the qualifiers was a 6–1 away loss to Russia.

For their first World Cup qualifying campaign, Andorra were drawn in a group with Cyprus, Estonia, Ireland, the Netherlands and Portugal. They lost their opening match 1–0 to Estonia. In the next game, they lost 3–2 to Cyprus but scored their first World Cup qualifying goals. They were again defeated by Estonia, this time 2–1. They lost all their matches and their only away goal was in a 3–1 loss against Ireland. Their worst defeat was 7–1 to Portugal on a neutral ground in Lleida, Spain. Andorra finished the campaign with no points and conceded 36 goals in ten matches.

In the team's qualification campaign for Euro 2004 they again lost every game. They scored their only goal in a 2–1 away loss to Bulgaria. In this competition the scores were closer than before as they lost 3–0 to Bulgaria, Croatia and Belgium, 2–0 twice to Estonia, 2–0 to Croatia and 1–0 to Belgium.

By Andorran standards, qualification for the 2006 World Cup was successful. They won their first competitive game 1–0 at home against Macedonia. Andorra midfielder Marc Bernaus, who played in the Spanish second division, received a long throw in off his chest and volleyed in a goal early in the second half. After the game, Macedonia coach Dragan Kanatlarovski resigned and called the game "a shameful outcome, a humiliation." Andorra also drew two matches, 0–0 in Macedonia and 0–0 at home against Finland.

In Euro 2008 qualifying, Andorra again lost every game. The closest game was against Russia, a 1–0 defeat on 21 November 2007. Their biggest defeat was a 7–0 loss to Croatia in Andorra La Vella, which is their worst defeat in UEFA competitions and matched their loss to the Czech Republic as their largest losing deficit. Andorra scored only two goals and conceded 42 in a total of 12 games. In 2010 World Cup qualifying, Andorra lost all ten matches. For the tournament, they scored three goals, in defeats to Belarus and Kazakhstan, and conceded 39 goals, including six in a defeat to England, the largest margin in the group.

Qualifying for UEFA Euro 2012 ended in familiar fashion; they lost all ten matches, scoring only one goal and conceding 25; their best results were two one-goal losses to Slovakia and a 3–1 loss in Ireland. The 2014 World Cup qualifying tournament was even more disastrous. Andorra lost all their matches while conceding 30 goals and not scoring.

During 2016 UEFA Euro qualifying, Andorra again lost all of its ten games but scored four goals, setting a national team record for goals scored in a European Championship qualifying group. On 22 February 2017, Andorra beat San Marino away 2–0 in a friendly match, ending with 12 years and 132 days without winning any match. On 9 June 2017, Andorra beat Hungary 1–0 in a World Cup home qualifier with a goal by Marc Rebés, their first victory in a competitive match since 2004. Thanks to these two wins and a draw against the Faroe Islands on 6 July 2017, Andorra progressed 57 positions in the FIFA rankings to 129th, its second best position ever. On 21 March 2018, Rebés scored the only goal of a friendly win over Liechtenstein in Spain, giving Andorra their third victory of the last 13 months and sixth of all time.

In 2018, Andorra made its debut in the newly created UEFA Nations League. They played in Group 1 of League D, where they finished at the bottom of the group with four ties and two losses, finishing unbeaten at home.

On 11 October 2019, Andorra won 1–0 against Moldova in the UEFA Euro 2020 qualifying competition, thus ending a 56-match winless run in Euro qualifiers. One month later, the team earned one more point after an away draw against Albania, thus avoiding for the first time to end a qualifying round in the last position.

On December 7, 2020, after the draw for the 2022 World Cup qualifiers, Andorra is given an opportunity to achieve further success in official competition as it is placed in Group I where it will find among its five opponents San Marino, the lowest placed team in the last pot and which it has faced before that only once in a friendly match (away on February 22, 2017 for a 2–0 victory). Their other opponents are Albania (against whom they drew 2–2 away in Euro 2021 qualifying), Hungary (whom they beat at home 1–0 in the 2018 World Cup qualifiers), Poland and England. On September 2, 2021, Andorra signs a 3rd success in the qualifiers of a World Cup, at home against San Marino (2–0). On October 12, 2021, Andorra signs a 4th success in a World Cup qualifier, beating San Marino again in the return match (3–0). It is also a first in several respects: it is the largest Andorran victory in its history, but also the first time that the Pyrenean selection manages to score 3 goals in the same game and won away match; finally it also succeeds for the first time in its history to sign 2 successes in the same qualifying phase and pocket 6 points. However, they lost all their games against their four other opponents and finished second to last in the group with 6 points, with a record of 2 wins and 8 losses.

On March 25, 2022, Andorra defeated St. Kitts and Nevis at home (1–0), recording its first win against a non-European team. Three days later, Andorra defeated another non-European side with another 1–0 win at home to Grenada. On June 10, 2022, in the 2022–23 edition of the UEFA Nations League, Andorra won at home against Liechtenstein (2–1), with Jesús Rubio scoring a spectacular goal with a 60-meter lob on the second Andorran goal, thus signing its first success in this competition for its third participation. This success also means that the Pyrenean team has achieved at least one victory in each of the official competitions in which it has taken part. On September 22nd, they beat Liechtenstein, 2–0, in Vaduz - this was their first away win in the Nations League. The Pyrenees team totaled 8 points at the end of this edition thanks to two home draws against Moldova (0–0) and the Latvia (1–1), finishing undefeated at home and losing only two away games against the Latvians and Moldovans, which is its best record in the group stage of any competition.

Stadium

From 1996 until 2014, Andorra played their home matches at the Comunal d'Andorra la Vella, in the capital city of Andorra la Vella. This stadium has a capacity of 1,800 and also hosts the matches of club sides FC Andorra and the Andorran Premier League. On 9 September 2014, the national team began playing at the new Estadi Nacional with a capacity of 3,306.

Andorra have occasionally played home matches outside their borders. For example, Andorra hosted France and England in the 2000 European Championship, 2008 European Championship and 2010 World Cup qualifiers in the Estadi Olímpic Lluís Companys in Barcelona, which was the home of RCD Espanyol between 1997 and 2009.

Reputation
Andorra's lopsided win–loss record gives them a lowly reputation in world football. The nation has only won seven competitive fixtures, four World Cup qualifying matches against Macedonia in October 2004 and Hungary in June 2017, both by 1–0; San Marino in September and October 2021 by 2–0 at home and 3–0 away at Serravalle (their biggest ever win), a single European Championship qualifying match at home against Moldova in October 2019 by 1–0 and two UEFA Nations League matches against Liechtenstein in June and September 2022 by 2–1 at home and 2–0 away at Vaduz ; and six friendly games, three of them by 2–0 against Belarus in April 2000 and Albania in April 2002 at home and San Marino in February 2017 away, as well as three wins by 1–0 margin against Liechtenstein at neutral venues in March 2018 and against St. Kitts and Nevis and Grenada at home in March 2022.

With the fourth smallest population of any UEFA country, until the admission of Gibraltar, the talent pool is small.  Players are predominantly amateurs because the Andorra domestic league is only part-time. Since Andorra began playing in 1996, their average FIFA ranking is 163.

Kit suppliers

Recent results and fixtures

2022

2023

Manager history

  Isidre Codina (1996)
  Manuel Miluir (1997–1999)
  David Rodrigo (1999–2009)
  Koldo Álvarez (2010–present)

Players

Current squad
The following players were called up for the friendly games against Austria and Gibraltar on 16 and 19 November 2022.

Caps and goals correct as of 19 November 2022, after the match against Gibraltar.

Recent call-ups
The following players have been called up to the Andorra squad in the last 12 months.

PRE

Notes
 INJ = Withdrew due to injury
 PRE = Preliminary squad / standby
 RET = Retired from the national team

RecordsPlayers in bold are still active with Andorra.Most appearances

Top goalscorers

Competition records

FIFA World Cup record

UEFA European Championship record

UEFA Nations League record

Head-to-head record

Last match updated was against Gibraltar on 19 November 2022. Goal difference used to determine placement if results totals of two opponents are identical.

Notes:
 FIFA-unofficial match on 19 February 1998 between Andorra – Czech Republic (0–1) is not included.''

Notes

References

External links

 
 Archive of most capped players, highest goalscorers and coaches at RSSSF
 Team profile at National Football Teams
 Association: Andorra at UEFA
 Association: Andorra at FIFA

 
European national association football teams
Football in Andorra
1996 establishments in Andorra
National sports teams established in 1996